Banding may refer to:
 Banding (medical), procedures that use elastic bands for constriction
Bird banding/ringing, the marking of individual birds with bands or rings to enable individual identification
 Colour banding, an inaccuracy in computer graphics
 Edge banding, a woodworking technique
 G banding, a genetic technique
 Minor variations in outputs from printers and photocopiers that allow forensic identification
 Another name for strapping, the process of applying a strap to an item to combine, hold, reinforce, or fasten it, or the strap or band itself
 Ability grouping, the educational practice of placing students into groups based on their abilities, talents or  achievements
 Flow banding, a geological term to describe bands or layers in rocks
 Occupational exposure banding, a chemical risk assessment process

See also
 Band (disambiguation)